USS LST-1072 was an  in the United States Navy. Like many of her class, she was not named and is properly referred to by her hull designation.

Construction
LST-1072 was laid down on 16 February 1945, at Hingham, Massachusetts, by the Bethlehem-Hingham Shipyard; launched on 20 March 1945; sponsored by Mrs. Florence Mitchell; and commissioned on 16 March 1945.

Service history
Following World War II, LST-1072 performed occupation duty in the Far East until early December 1945. She was transferred to the Military Sea Transportation Service (MSTS) on 2 April 1951, where she operated as USNS T-LST-1072. The ship was transferred to the Philippines, under the Security Assistance Program, on 13 September 1976. She was renamed Tawi Tawi (LT-512) and commissioned into the Philippine Navy. She was scrapped at an unknown date.

Notes

Citations

Bibliography 

Online resources

External links
 

 

LST-542-class tank landing ships
Ships built in Hingham, Massachusetts
1945 ships
World War II amphibious warfare vessels of the United States
Ships transferred from the United States Navy to the Philippine Navy